Drake is an unincorporated community in Marlboro County, South Carolina, United States.

Geography
Drake is located at latitude 35.523 and longitude –79.667. The elevation is 85 feet.

Demographics

References

External links

Unincorporated communities in Marlboro County, South Carolina
Unincorporated communities in South Carolina